Kuthiala Sheikhan is a village and [./Https://mbdin.com/tehsils-unions-in-the-district-of-mandi-bahauddin/ union council] of Mandi Bahauddin District in the Punjab province of Pakistan. It is located at an altitude of 217 metres (715 feet).

Caste in Kuthiala Sheikhan 

1)

Sheikh

2)

Tulla  

3)

Some others caste

Kuthiala Sheikhan is one of the big and developed towns of Mandi Bahauddin District. If Kuthiala Sheikhan is also called a small city, it will not be out of place.

References

Union councils of Mandi Bahauddin District
Villages in Mandi Bahauddin District